Modus Vivendi (a Latin phrase for "way of life") is the debut studio album by American Alternative Pop artist 070 Shake. It was released by GOOD Music and Def Jam on January 17, 2020. It was promoted by the singles "Morrow", "Nice to Have", "Under the Moon" and "Guilty Conscience", and features production from Mike Dean and indie rock musician Dave Hamelin, among others.

Background and recording
In 2018, Shake released her debut EP Glitter. In 2018, the New Jersey artist contributed vocals to Kanye West's ye, Nas's Nasir, Pusha-T's Daytona, and Teyana Taylor's K.T.S.E. In 2019, she contributed to West's Jesus Is King, though her vocals are not present on the final album.

Shake announced her debut album June 24, 2019. The press release stated that Modus Vivendi is "coming soon" on GOOD Music/Def Jam, and that it would feature the previously released singles "Morrow" and "Nice to Have". Shake also announced a new tour behind the new record.

In an interview with Billboard, she stated that she retreated to a Los Angeles studio and recorded a hundred songs in just over a month with producers Dave Hamelin and Mike Dean.

The cover art was created by Sam Spratt, a New York-based illustrator.

Critical reception

Modus Vivendi received critical acclaim. At Metacritic, which assigns a normalized rating out of 100 to reviews from mainstream publications, Modus Vivendi received a weighted average score of 80, based on 10 reviews, which indicates "generally favorable reviews". Aggregator AnyDecentMusic? gave the album a 7.4 out of 10, based on their assessment of the critical consensus.

Dhruva Balram of NME praised 070 Shake's lyricism and emotion, writing: "Shedding collaborations entirely, the album consists solely of 070 Shake's hypnotising hooks and shape-shifting vocals. It cements the 22-year-old as a unique artist, proving to everyone – and perhaps even herself – that she doesn't need anyone but her voice to vault herself to success. On Modus Vivendi, she manages to craft a sound that's anthemic, and built for festivals and clubs; but within the grooves, she's precise. Nothing feels out of place. This is project sculpted away from current trends." Reed Jackson of Pitchfork described the album as "intensely sincere, with the New Jersey native proudly serving her soul raw atop bullish, beautiful production", while stating "it is the most compelling and complete release under G.O.O.D. Music since Pusha T's Daytona."

Accolades

Track listing
Credits adapted from Tidal. On January 29, 2020, the album was re-uploaded with changes in track sequencing and mixing.

Notes
  signifies a co-producer
  signifies an additional producer

Sample credits
 "The Pines" contains a interpolation of "In the Pines", a traditional folk song.
 "It's Forever" contains samples of "It's Forever", written by Kenneth Gamble and Leon Huff and performed by the Ebonys.
 "Rocketship" contains samples of "Snowflakes Are Dancing", written by Claude Debussy and performed by Isao Tomita.
 "Guilty Conscience" contains samples of "Stand by Me", written by Ben E. King, Jerry Leiber and Mike Stoller and performed by Ben E. King.

Personnel
Musicians
 Dave Hamelin – bass guitar , guitar , keyboards , synthesizer , tambourine 
 dom$olo – keyboards 
 Francis and the Lights – programmer 
 Gitai Vinshtock – guitar 
 Isaiah Gage – cello 
 Joel Shearer – guitar 
 Juan Brito – keyboards 
 Justus West – guitar 
 Mike Dean – bass guitar , drums , guitar , keyboards , piano , synthesizer 
 Sarah Schachner – cello , string arranger , strings , viola , violin 
 Sean Solymar – guitar , keyboards , piano 
 Stephen Feigenbaum – string arranger 
 Timmy Manson Jr. – keyboards 
 William Moraites – bass guitar 
 Yasmeen Al-Mazeedi – strings , violin 

Technical
 Adrián Meléndez – recording engineer 
 Brian Chirlo – recording engineer 
 Dave Hamelin – recording engineer 
 Jenna Felsenthal – recording engineer 
 Joe Tarsia – recording engineer 
 Juan Brito – recording engineer 
 Mike Dean – mastering engineer , mixer , recording engineer 
 Pat Rosario – recording engineer 
 Sean Solymar – assistant mixer

Instrumental version
On June 26, 2020, an instrumental version of the album, called Modus Vivendi: Instrumental Selections, was released through digital retailers. The instrumental album contains the instrumental versions of ten songs from the original album.

Charts

References

External links
 

2020 debut albums
070 Shake albums
Albums produced by Dave Hamelin
Albums produced by Francis and the Lights
Albums produced by James Shaw (musician)
Albums produced by Kenneth Gamble
Albums produced by Leon Huff
Albums produced by Mike Dean (record producer)
Albums produced by Sarah Schachner
Def Jam Recordings albums
GOOD Music albums